The 2002 Grand Prix at Road America was the twelfth round of the 2002 CART FedEx Champ Car World Series season, held on August 18, 2002 at Road America in Elkhart Lake, Wisconsin.

Qualifying results

Race

Caution flags

Notes 

 New Race Record Cristiano da Matta 1:56:43.030
 Average Speed 124.856 mph

References

External links
 Friday Qualifying Results
 Saturday Qualifying Results
 Race Results

Road
Grand Prix At Road America
Grand Prix At Road America
Champ Car Grand Prix of Road America